Baháʼu'lláh, founder of the Baháʼí Faith, wrote many books and revealed thousands of tablets and prayers, of which only a fraction has so far been translated into English.

Around two third of the texts are in Arabic, and one third in Persian, or a combination of both languages.

The list below, organized by the city he was in while he wrote the tablet, is not complete; it shows only the best-known writings of Baháʼu'lláh.

Tehran
1852
Rashḥ-i-Amá, "Sprinkling from a Cloud" a poem of 20 verses in Persian, written when Baháʼu'lláh was imprisoned in the Síyáh-Chál in Tehran, after he received a vision of a Maid of Heaven, through whom he received his mission as a Messenger of God and as the One whose coming the Báb had prophesied.

Baghdad
1854
Lawḥ-i-Kullu-Ṭaám, "Tablet of All Food"

Sulaymaniyah, Kurdistan
1855
Qaṣídiy-i-Varqáíyyih, "Ode of the Dove"

Baghdad

1857
Ṣaḥífiy-i-Shaṭṭíyyih, "Book of the River [Tigris]"

1857–58
Chahár Vádí, "Four Valleys" The Four Valleys was written around 1857 in Baghdad, in response to questions of Shaykh ʻAbdu'r-Rahman-i-Talabani, the "honored and indisputable leader" of the Qádiríyyih Order of Sufism.
Kalimát-i-Maknúnih, "Hidden Words" The Hidden Words is written in the form of a collection of short utterances, 71 in Arabic and 82 in Persian, in which Baháʼu'lláh claims to have taken the basic essence of certain spiritual truths and written them in brief form.

1857–63
Haft Vádí, "Seven Valleys" The Seven Valleys was written around 1860 in Baghdad after Baháʼu'lláh had returned from the Sulaymaniyah region in Kurdistan. The work was written in response to questions posed by Shaykh Muhyi'd-Din, a judge, who was a follower of the Qádiríyyih Order of Sufism.
Hurúfát-i-'Álín, "The Exalted Letters"
Javáhiru'l-Asrár, "Gems of Divine Mysteries"
Lawh-i-Áyiy-i-Núr, "Tablet of the 'Light Verse'" [of the Qurʼan]), also known as Tafsír-i-Hurúfát-i-Muqatta'ih, "Commentary on the Isolated Letters"
Lawh-i-Fitnih, "Tablet of the Test"
Lawh-i-Húríyyih, "Tablet of the Maiden"
Madínatu'r-Ridá, "City of Radiance/Radiant Acquiescence"
Madínatu't-Tawhíd, "City of Unity"
Shikkar-Shikan-Shavand, "Sweet Scented Being"
Súriy-i-Nush, "Súrih of Counsel"
Súriy-i-Qadír, "Surih of the Omnipotent"
Aṣl-i-Kullu'l-K͟hayr, "Words of Wisdom"

1858–63
Subhána-Rabbíya'l-A'lá, "Praise to the Exalted Lord"
Lawh-i-Ghulámu'l-Khuld, "Tablet of the Eternal Youth"
Húr-i-Ujáb, "The Wondrous Maiden"
Az-Bágh-i-Iláhí, "From The Garden of Holiness"

1862
Kitáb-i-Íqán, "The Book of Certitude"

1863
Lawh-i-Ayyúb, "Tablet of Job"
Lawh-i-Malláhu'l-Quds, "Tablet of the Holy Mariner"

On the way to Constantinople
1863
Lawh-i-Hawdaj, "Tablet of the Howdah [a seat for riding a camel]"

Constantinople (Istanbul)
1863
Subhánika-Yá-Hú, "Praised be Thou, O He!," also known as Lawh-i-Naqus, "Tablet of the Bell"

“Tablet of Ridva” March, 1863 Baghdad, Iraq

Adrianople (Edirne)
1864
Súriy-i-'Ibád, "Tablet of the Servants/People"
Lawh-i-Salmán, "First Tablet to Salmán"

1864–66
Lawh-i-Laylatu'l-Quds, "Tablet of the Sacred Night"

1864–68
Lawh-i-Siráj, "Tablet for Siraj"
Mathnavíy-i-Mubárak, "Blessed Mathnaví [collection of poetry]"
Súriy-i-Asháb, "Surih of the Companions"
Súrihs of Hajj, "Tablets of Pilgrimage"
Súriy-i-Qalam (Súrih of the Pen)

1865
Lawh-i-Ahmad, "Tablet of Ahmad," Arabic
Lawh-i-Ahmad, "Tablet of Ahmad," Persian

1865–66
Lawh-i-Bahá, "Tablet of Glory"
Súriy-i-Damm, "Tablet of Blood"

1866
Lawh-i-Rúh, "Tablet of Spirit"
Lawh-i-Khalíl, "Tablet to Jinab-i Khalil ["the friend"]"

1866-68
Lawh-i-Ashraf, "Tablet to Ashraf ["the noble"]"
Lawh-i-Nasír, "Tablet to Nasír ["the defender"]"

1867
Lawh-i-Sayyáh, "Tablet of the Traveller"

1867–68
Súriy-i-Mulúk, "Tablet to the Kings"
Kitáb-i-Badíʻ, "Wondrous/Unique Book"
Súriy-i-Ghusn, "Tablet of the Branch"

1867–69
Lawh-i-Sultán, "Tablet to the Sultan [Nasiri'd-Din Shah]"

1867
Lawh-i-Napulyún, "First Tablet to Napoleon III"

On the way to ʻAkká
1868
Súriy-i-Ra'ís, "Tablet of the Premier/President [Ali Pasha]"

'Akká
1868
Lawh-i-Salmán II, "Second Tablet of Salmán"
Lawh-i-Ra'ís, "Tablet to the Premier/President/Chief [Ali Pasha]"

1868–70
Lawh-i-Malik-i-Rus, "Tablet to Tsar Alexander II" 
Lawh-i-Malikih, "Tablet to Queen Victoria" 
Lawh-i-Pisar-'Amm, "Tablet to the Cousin"

1869
Lawh-i-Ridván, "Tablet of Ridván"
Lawh-i-Fu'ád, "Tablet to Fu'ád Páshá"
Lawh-i-Napulyún, "Second Tablet to Napoleon III
Lawh-i-Páp, "Tablet to Pope Pius IX" 
Súriy-i-Haykal, "Tablet of the Temple/Body"

1870–75
Lawh-i-Tibb, "Tablet to the Physician/Tablet of Medicine"

1870–77
Lawh-i-Mánikchí Sáhib, "Tablet to Mánikchí"
Lawh-i-Haft Purshish, "Tablet of Seven Questions"

1871
Lawh-i-Qad Ihtaraqa'l-Mukhlisún, "The Fire Tablet"

1873
Kitáb-i-Aqdas, "The Most Holy Book" 
Lawh-i-Ru'yá, "Tablet of Vision"

1873–74
Lawḥ-i-Ḥikmat, "Tablet of Wisdom"

Mazraʼih and Bahjí
1877–79
Lawḥ-i-Burhán, "Tablet of the Proof"

1879–91

Tajallíyát, "Effulgences"
Bis͟hárát, "Glad-Tidings"
Lawh-i-Ittihád, "Tablet of Unity"
Súriy-i-Vafá, "Tablet to Muhammad Husayn, 'Vafá'" ["fidelity"]
Kalimát-i-Firdawsíyyih, "Words of Paradise"
Lawḥ-i-Aqdas, "Most Holy Tablet"
Lawḥ-i-Arḍ-i-Bá, "Tablet of the Land of Bá [Beirut]"
Kitáb-i-ʻAhd, "Book of My Covenant"
Lawḥ-i-Dunyá, "Tablet of the World"

1882
Lawḥ-i-Maqṣúd, "Tablet of The Desired One [maqsúd]"

1885–88
Is͟hráqát, "Splendours"

1888
Ṭarázát, "Ornaments"

1891
Lawh-i-Times, "Tablet to The Times"
Lawḥ-i-Karmil, "Tablet of [Mount] Carmel"
Lawh-i-Ibn-i-Dhib, "Epistle to the Son of the Wolf"

See also
Baháʼí literature
Gleanings from the Writings of Baháʼu'lláh

Notes

References
 Savi, Julio (2012). Baháʼu'lláh's Persian Poems Written before 1863 in: Lights of Irfan, volume 13. Wilmette, IL. pp. 317–361.

Winters, Jonah (2002). Notes and Commentary on the Tablets of Baháʼu'lláh: Wilmette Institute study materials.

Further reading

External links
Baháʼí Reference Library Searchable online editions of Baháʼí sacred texts in English, Arabic, and Persian.
Loom of Reality: A Partial Inventory of the Works of the Central Figures of the Bahá'í Faith, a catalog including 11,600 works attributed to Bahá’u’lláh
 British Library: Baha'i Sacred Texts (2019)
Displaying the Bahaʼi Faith: the pen is mightier than the sword. Exposition on Baháʼu'lláh's writings at the British Museum, London (2017).

 
 
1850s works
1860s works
1870s works
1880s works
1890s works
Bah
Bah
Bah
Bah
Bah
Bah